MEF University is a non-profit private university in Istanbul, founded by the İbrahim Arıkan Education and Scientific Research Foundation. It opened in the academic year 2014–2015. It is the first university in the world to adopt the "flipped classroom" educational model university-wide.

History 
MEF Educational Institutions were first established in 1972, when the MEF Tutoring Schools were established. MEF University was established by the İbrahim Arıkan Education and Scientific Research Foundation.

Faculties, departments and schools 
MEF University's medium of education is English, with the exception of the School of Law which is 30% in English.

Faculties

Faculty of Education 
 Mathematics Education
 English Language Education  
 Guidance and Psychological Counseling

Faculty of Law 
 Law

Faculty of Economics, Administrative and Social Sciences 
 Economics
 Business Administration
 Political Science and International Relations
 Psychology

Faculty of Engineering 
 Computer Engineering
 Electrical-Electronics Engineering
 Industrial Engineering
 Civil Engineering
 Mechanical Engineering

Faculty of Art, Design and Architecture 
 Architecture
 Interior Design

Vocational school 
 Banking and Insurance Program

Educational method 
MEF University is the only university in the world that has adopted the "flipped classroom" educational method university-wide.

References

External links
 MEF University website

Private universities and colleges in Turkey
2014 establishments in Turkey
Universities and colleges in Istanbul
Universities and colleges in Turkey